1999 in Russian football was marked by the national team's failure to qualify for the Euro 2000. Spartak Moscow won the league title, while Zenit were the victors of the Russian Cup.

National team
Russia national football team failed to qualify for the Euro 2000. After a run of six straight wins, a draw with Ukraine left Russia in the third position in the group.

 Russia score given first

Key
 H = Home match
 A = Away match
 F = Friendly
 ECQ = 2000 UEFA European Football Championship qualifying, Group 4

Leagues

Top Division

First Division

Anzhi won the First Division, winning their first promotion to the Top Division. Runners-up Fakel made their return to the top flight.

Top goalscorers

Second Division
Of six clubs that finished first in their respective Second Division zones, three play-off winners were promoted to the First Division:

Cup
The Russian Cup was won by Zenit Saint Petersburg, who beat Dynamo Moscow 3–1 in the final.

UEFA club competitions

UEFA Cup Winners' Cup 1998-99
Lokomotiv Moscow reached the semifinal of the last Cup Winners' Cup, defeating Maccabi Haifa in the quarterfinal 4–0 on aggregate. In the semifinal Lokomotiv were eliminated by eventual winners S.S. Lazio on away goals.

UEFA Intertoto Cup 1999
FC Rostov eliminated Cementarnica 55 Skopje and NK Varteks in the UEFA Intertoto Cup 1999, setting up a tie against Juventus F.C. Juventus comfortably won twice, recording a 9–1 aggregate score.

UEFA Champions League 1999-00
CSKA Moscow began their campaign in the second qualifying round but lost to Molde F.K. Spartak Moscow successfully passed the third qualifying round, eliminating FK Partizan, and qualified for the main competition where they finished third in a group with AC Sparta Prague, FC Girondins de Bordeaux, and Willem II Tilburg.

UEFA Cup 1999-00
Lokomotiv Moscow started 1999–00 UEFA Cup in the qualifying round. After eliminating BATE Borisov with the score 12–1 Lokomotiv defeated Lyngby Boldklub 5–1 on aggregate in the first round, but lost to Leeds United A.F.C. with the aggregate score of 1–7. Russia's second participants, Zenit Saint Petersburg were eliminated by Bologna F.C. 1909 in the first round.

References
National team fixtures 
League and cup results
UEFA Champions League results
UEFA Cup Winners' Cup results
UEFA Cup results 
UEFA Intertoto Cup results

 
Seasons in Russian football